The South Carolina Governor's School for Science and Mathematics (GSSM) is a public, boarding high school for students in grades 11 and 12, located in Hartsville, South Carolina.  The school concentrates on science and mathematics, but offers the full spectrum of the humanities as well.

The school has 29 full-time teachers; 93% with doctorates and 100% with master's degrees. Students regularly score the highest SAT and ACT average in the state.  The school was named "#1 Best Public High School in South Carolina" by Niche.com in 2020 and The Washington Post's "Top-Performing Schools with Elite Students" in 2016.

Academics
Students at GSSM select from a wide range of STEM courses during their two years on campus. Typically, 18 AP courses are offered and 45% of the STEM courses are listed as "Above AP". Students can conduct semester or year-long scientific investigations, in addition to the required Summer Program for Research Interns (SPRI). During SPRI, students conduct six weeks of mentored scientific, business or economics research at university or corporate R&D labs across South Carolina or in locations across the United States and other countries. In 2009, GSSM began the Research Exchange Scholars Program (later renamed the Research Experience Scholars Program) with exchange students from Pforzheim, Germany and Daejeon, Korea. The program has grown to include more locations in Germany and China, and plans are underway to include sites in a number of countries. In 2017, the RESP program included sites in Germany, Korea, and China.

In addition to a rigorous STEM curriculum, GSSM also offers a wealth of humanities courses and a January Interim mini-mester of experiential courses and national and international trips. Courses and trips vary from year to year.

Every student is assigned a college counselor that has years of experience working in college admission offices. GSSM helps students get into the colleges they want and helps them apply for scholarships.

Outreach
Beyond the education provided to students in residence, the school delivers outreach programs for middle schoolers in satellite locations statewide, as well as for rising 8th through 10th graders at its annual, residential summer program, GoSciTech.

GoSciTech, originally named Summer Science Program (SSP), began as a one-week program in 1990. As of 2012, the camp expanded to offer up to four weeks of courses and was renamed GoSciTech. In 2016, nearly 30 courses were offered to over 500 students.

Satellite camps include iTEAMS Xtreme and iTEAMS Xtreme: Next Generation, computer science, technology and robotics day camps. CREATEng, an engineering and design thinking day camp, was added in 2014. More than 1300 students and teachers from across the state participated in GSSM's summer outreach programs during the 2016 summer.

History
The school was founded in 1988 by Governor Carroll Campbell and Charles W. Coker on the grounds of Coker College. It moved to a purpose-built campus nearby in 2003. In 2010, two new wings were added: the Academic Wing, containing classrooms and laboratories, and the Student Activities Center, which includes an engineering projects center and also a gym, weight room, game room, and kitchen. In 2015, the school reached maximum capacity of 288 students.

Admissions
Admission to GSSM is by application and open to any resident of South Carolina in their sophomore year of high school. Juniors and seniors are not eligible to apply. Applicants are invited through a competitive selection process, with about 149 invited in 2016 (varying from year to year so that the student body size at the start of each year is 288). Applications are due by February 15 for 'priority admissions' and July 1 for 'rolling admissions' (2021 ) before the school year in which the students will begin attending. For the 2020–2021 school year, submission of a PSAT, SAT, or ACT score was optional. The initial application consists of three required essays, one optional essay, a character video, teacher recommendations, and a high school transcript. Students who meet the basic requirements are invited for an interview in March. The acceptance decision is released by the end of March. The remaining students are placed on a waiting list, which is pulled from should any of the originally selected students decide not to accept.

Student life

All students live in the dorms. Each suite consists of two rooms and a bathroom connecting them; two students live in each room. There are two sides to the dorms: A side for AMAB people and B side for AFAB people. Each side has three floors (called houses). There is one RLC (Residence Life Coordinator) per floor. RLCs are full-time staff members that live on campus to assist the students. The RLCs are assisted by two RAs (Resident Assistants) who are Coker University students that live at GSSM.

Much of the student body participates in the school's numerous clubs and societies. GSSM has almost 70 clubs and societies. Notable clubs include the Interact club, which connects students to volunteer opportunities, the Mock Trial club and Academic Team, and Common Ground, an LGBT club for queers and allies.

Many students also participate in varsity athletics with cross country, swimming, volleyball, tennis and soccer teams consistently ranked highly and/or participating in state championships. In 2017, boys' cross country won the 1A state championship. In 2018, the boys' soccer team won the South Carolina division 1A state championship. In November 2018, the girls' volleyball team won the South Carolina division 1A state championship. The school also boasts multiple individual and team track and field state champions, as well as SC state chess championships.

Students are required to complete 50 hours of community service annually, though a majority of the students surpass this requirement. Service projects include tutoring local students and residents, computer, website and IT help for business owners, volunteering at the animal shelter and food bank, and helping around campus.

Notable alumni
Aziz Ansari – actor, comedian, and filmmaker
Hon. Shiva Hodges – U.S. Magistrate for the District of South Carolina

See also
 South Carolina Governor's School For The Arts & Humanities, similar program located in Greenville, SC, opened in 1999.
 Alabama School of Mathematics and Science
 Arkansas School for Mathematics, Sciences, and the Arts
 Carol Martin Gatton Academy of Mathematics and Science in Kentucky
 Craft Academy for Excellence in Science and Mathematics
 Illinois Mathematics and Science Academy
 Indiana Academy for Science, Mathematics, and Humanities
 Kansas Academy of Mathematics and Science
 Louisiana School for Math, Science, and the Arts
 Maine School of Science and Mathematics 
 Mississippi School for Mathematics and Science
 North Carolina School of Science and Mathematics
 Oklahoma School of Science and Mathematics
 Texas Academy of Mathematics and Science

References

External links
 SCGSSM Official Site

Boarding schools in South Carolina
Gifted education
NCSSS schools
Schools in Darlington County, South Carolina
Public high schools in South Carolina
Educational institutions established in 1988
Governor's Schools
Hartsville, South Carolina
Public boarding schools in the United States
1988 establishments in South Carolina